= Baptism of Christ (Veronese) =

c. 1580–1588 oil on canvas painting by Paolo Veronese

Baptism of Christ is a c.1580-1588 oil on canvas painting by Paolo Veronese and his studio, now in the J. Paul Getty Museum, which bought it in 1979. It is notable for showing Christ spreading his arms to keep his balance, in a foreshadowing of the Crucifixion.
